Daniel J. "Dan" Vella (born November 18, 1955) is a Canadian Champion Thoroughbred racehorse trainer.

Born in Toronto, Ontario, Vella was introduced to thoroughbred horse racing by an uncle who owned horses. After graduating from high school, Vella went to work at a racetrack in his native Toronto. After an apprenticeship he worked as an assistant trainer with Patrick Collins and got his first win in 1985. Following the death of Patrick Collins in 1990, Vella took over as head trainer for the prominent Woodbine-based Knob Hill Stable where he remained until joining the racing operations of Frank Stronach in late 1991.

Biography 

Training for Stronach Stables, between 1993 and 1998 Vella spent a good part of his time competing in the United States but won important races at Woodbine including Canada's most prestigious race in 1994, the Queen's Plate. That year, he was voted the Canadian Sovereign Award for Outstanding Trainer and repeated as Champion trainer in 1995. After parting ways with Stonach Stables he remained working in the United States then returned to a Toronto base in 2003.

References 
 Daniel J. Vella at the NTRA
 Daniel J. Vella at Woodbine Entertainment

1955 births
Living people
Canadian horse trainers
Sovereign Award winners
Sportspeople from Toronto